Sir Ian Holm Cuthbert  (12 September 1931 – 19 June 2020) was an English actor known for his roles on stage and screen. Beginning his career on the British stage as a standout member of the Royal Shakespeare Company, he later transitioned into a successful and prolific screen career. He received numerous accolades including two BAFTA Awards and a Tony Award along with nominations for an Academy Award and two Emmy Awards. He was made a Commander of the Order of the British Empire (CBE) in 1989 by Queen Elizabeth II.

Holm won the 1967 Tony Award for Best Featured Actor for his performance as Lenny in the Harold Pinter play The Homecoming. He won the Laurence Olivier Award for Best Actor for his performance in the title role in the 1998 West End production of King Lear. For his television roles he received two Primetime Emmy Award nominations for King Lear (1998), and the HBO film The Last of the Blonde Bombshells (2003).

He gained acclaim for his role in The Bofors Gun (1968) winning the BAFTA Award for Best Actor in a Supporting Role. He received an Academy Award for Best Supporting Actor nomination and a BAFTA Award win for his role as athletics trainer Sam Mussabini in Chariots of Fire (1981). Other notable film roles include in Alien (1979), Brazil (1985), Henry V (1989), The Madness of King George (1994), The Fifth Element (1997), The Sweet Hereafter (1997), and The Aviator (2004). He gained wider appreciation for his role as the elderly Bilbo Baggins in Peter Jackson's The Lord of the Rings and The Hobbit trilogies. He also voiced Chef Skinner in the Pixar animated film Ratatouille (2007).

Early life and education
Ian Holm Cuthbert was born on 12 September 1931 in Goodmayes, Essex, to Scottish parents, James Harvey Cuthbert and his wife Jean Wilson (née Holm). His father was a psychiatrist who worked as the superintendent of the West Ham Corporation Mental Hospital and was one of the pioneers of electric shock therapy; his mother was a nurse. He had an older brother, who died when Ian was 12 years old. Holm was educated at the independent Chigwell School in Essex. His parents retired to Mortehoe in Devon and then to Worthing, where he joined an amateur dramatic society.

A chance encounter with Henry Baynton, a well-known provincial Shakespearean actor, helped Holm train for admission to the Royal Academy of Dramatic Art, where he secured a place from 1950. His studies were interrupted a year later when he was called up for National Service in the British Army, during which he was posted to Klagenfurt, Austria, and attained the rank of Lance Corporal. They were interrupted a second time when he volunteered to go on an acting tour of the United States in 1952. Holm graduated from the Royal Academy of Dramatic Art in 1953. 

He made his stage debut in 1954, at Stratford-upon-Avon, playing a spear-carrier in a staging of Othello. Two years later, he made his London stage debut in Love Affair.

Career
Holm was an established star of the Royal Shakespeare Company before gaining notice in television and film. In 1965, he played Richard III in the BBC serialisation of The Wars of The Roses, based on the RSC production of the plays. In 1969, he appeared in Moonlight on the Highway. He appeared in minor roles in films such as Oh! What a Lovely War (1969), Nicholas and Alexandra (1971), Mary, Queen of Scots (1972) and Young Winston (1972).

In 1967 Holm won a Tony Award for Best Featured Actor in a Play as Lenny in The Homecoming by Harold Pinter. In 1977, Holm appeared in the television mini-series Jesus of Nazareth as the Sadducee Zerah, and a villainous Moroccan in March or Die. The following year he played J. M. Barrie in the award-winning BBC mini-series The Lost Boys, In 1981, he played Frodo Baggins in the BBC radio adaptation of J. R. R. Tolkien's The Lord of the Rings.

Holm's first film role to gain much notice was that of Ash, the "calm, technocratic" science officer - later revealed to be an android - in Ridley Scott's science-fiction film Alien (1979). His portrayal of the running coach Sam Mussabini in Chariots of Fire (1981) earned him a special award at the Cannes Film Festival, a BAFTA award for Best Actor in a Supporting Role, and an Academy Award nomination for Best Supporting Actor. In the 1980s, Holm had memorable roles in Time Bandits (1981), Greystoke: The Legend of Tarzan, Lord of the Apes (1984) and Brazil (1985). He played Lewis Carroll, the author of Alice in Wonderland, in Dreamchild (1985).

In 1989, Holm was nominated for a BAFTA award for the television series Game, Set and Match. Based on the novels by Len Deighton, this tells the story of an intelligence officer (Holm) who learns that his own wife is an enemy spy. He also continued to perform Shakespeare in films. He appeared with Kenneth Branagh in Henry V (1989) and as Polonius to Mel Gibson's Hamlet (1990). Holm was reunited with Branagh in Mary Shelley's Frankenstein (1994), playing the father of Branagh's Victor Frankenstein.

Holm raised his profile in 1997 with two prominent roles, as the priest Vito Cornelius in Luc Besson's sci-fi The Fifth Element and lawyer Mitchell Stephens in The Sweet Hereafter. In 2001 he starred in From Hell as the physician Sir William Withey Gull. The same year, he appeared as Bilbo Baggins in the blockbuster film The Lord of the Rings: The Fellowship of the Ring, having previously played Bilbo's nephew Frodo Baggins in the 1981 BBC Radio adaptation of The Lord of the Rings. He returned for The Lord of the Rings: The Return of the King (2003), for which he shared a SAG award for Outstanding Performance by a Cast in a Motion Picture. He later reprised his role as the elderly Bilbo Baggins in the movie The Hobbit: An Unexpected Journey and The Hobbit: The Battle of the Five Armies. Martin Freeman portrayed the young Bilbo Baggins in those films.

Holm was nominated for an Emmy Award twice, for a PBS broadcast of a National Theatre production of King Lear, in 1999; and for a supporting role in the HBO film The Last of the Blonde Bombshells opposite Judi Dench, in 2001. He appeared in two David Cronenberg films: Naked Lunch (1991) and eXistenZ (1999). He was Harold Pinter's favourite actor: the playwright once said: "He puts on my shoe, and it fits!" Holm played Lenny in both the London and New York City premieres of Pinter's The Homecoming. He played Napoleon Bonaparte three times: in the television mini-series Napoleon and Love (1974), Terry Gilliam's Time Bandits (1981), and The Emperor's New Clothes.

Holm also received royal recognition for his contributions: He was made CBE in 1989 and knighted in 1998.

Personal life
Holm was married four times: to Lynn Mary Shaw in 1955 (divorced 1965); to Sophie Baker in 1982 (divorced 1986); to actress Penelope Wilton, in Wiltshire, in 1991 (divorced 2002); and to the artist Sophie de Stempel in 2003. He had two daughters from his first marriage, a son from his second marriage, and a son and daughter from his 15-year relationship with photographer Bee Gilbert.

Holm and Wilton appeared together in the BBC miniseries The Borrowers (1993). His last wife, Sophie de Stempel, is a protégée and was a life model of Lucian Freud, as well as an artist in her own right.

Death

Holm was treated for prostate cancer in 2001 and was diagnosed with Parkinson's disease. He died in hospital in London on 19 June 2020 at the age of 88. His ashes are interred on the western side of Highgate Cemetery.

Filmography

Film

Television

Theatre

Honours and accolades 

 1989: Commander of the Order of the British Empire (CBE) in the 1989 Birthday Honours.
 1998: Knight Bachelor in the 1998 Birthday Honours for services to drama.

Bibliography

References

External links

Obituary: Ian Holm by BBC News. Published 19 June 2020.
Sir Ian Holm obituary by The Guardian. Authors - Michael Billington and Ryan Gilbey. Published 19 June 2020.

1931 births
2020 deaths
20th-century English male actors
21st-century English male actors
Actors awarded knighthoods
Alumni of RADA
Annie Award winners
Audiobook narrators
Best Actor Genie and Canadian Screen Award winners
Best Supporting Actor BAFTA Award winners
Burials at Highgate Cemetery
Cannes Film Festival Award for Best Actor winners
Commanders of the Order of the British Empire
Critics' Circle Theatre Award winners
Deaths from Parkinson's disease
Neurological disease deaths in England
English male Shakespearean actors
English male film actors
English male radio actors
English male stage actors
English male television actors
English male voice actors
English people of Scottish descent
Knights Bachelor
Laurence Olivier Award winners
Male actors from Essex
Outstanding Performance by a Cast in a Motion Picture Screen Actors Guild Award winners
People educated at Chigwell School
People from the London Borough of Redbridge
Royal Shakespeare Company members
Tony Award winners